John Chandler Harper (March 10, 1914 – November 8, 2004) was an American professional golfer, best known for winning the PGA Championship in 1950. He won seven times on the PGA Tour and played in the Ryder Cup in 1955.

Harper was born, raised and lived his entire life in Portsmouth, Virginia.  He was prominent in Virginia golf, winning the Virginia State Amateur three times (1930, 1932, 1934) and the Virginia State Open nine times (1932, 1938, 1940, 1941, 1952, 1960, 1967, 1968, 1970), a record which stands today. His golfing career was interrupted by service in the U.S. Navy during World War II.

Harper's competitive career lasted from 1938 to 1955; and like most professional golfers of his generation, he spent most of his time as a club professional. Harper compensated for his lack of driving distance with a strong short game; Ben Hogan said that Harper was the best putter on Tour.

After Curtis Strange's father died when he was 14, Harper became Strange's mentor. He was also a long-time friend of Bobby Jones. He was inducted into the Virginia Sports Hall of Fame in 1973 and to the PGA Hall of Fame in 1968. In 1956, Harper founded Bide-A-Wee Golf Course in his hometown of Portsmouth, and managed the course until he retired in 1992.  He died at the age of 90 of complications from pneumonia.

Professional wins (21)

PGA Tour wins (7)
1942 (1) Miami Biltmore International Four-Ball (with Herman Keiser)
1950 (2) Tucson Open, PGA Championship
1953 (1) El Paso Open
1954 (1) Texas Open
1955 (2) Virginia Beach Open, Colonial National Invitation

Major championship is shown in bold.

Other wins (12)
1932 Virginia Open (as an amateur)
1938 Virginia Open
1940 Virginia Open
1941 Virginia Open
1952 Virginia Open
1954 Middle Atlantic PGA Championship
1960 Virginia PGA Open
1967 Virginia PGA Open
1968 Virginia PGA Open, Virginia PGA Open
1969 Virginia PGA Open
1970 Virginia PGA Open

Senior wins (2)
1968 PGA Seniors' Championship, World Senior Championship

Major championships

Wins (1)

Note: The PGA Championship was match play until 1958

Results timeline

Note: Harper never played in The Open Championship.

NT = no tournament
WD = withdrew
DQ = disqualified
CUT = missed the half-way cut
R128, R64, R32, R16, QF, SF = round in which player lost in PGA Championship match play
"T" indicates a tie for a place

Summary

Most consecutive cuts made – 5 (twice)
Longest streak of top-10s – 1 (five times)

U.S. national team appearances
Ryder Cup: 1955 (winners)
Hopkins Trophy: 1954 (winners)

See also

List of golfers with most PGA Tour wins
List of men's major championships winning golfers

References

American male golfers
PGA Tour golfers
Winners of men's major golf championships
Ryder Cup competitors for the United States
Golfers from Virginia
Woodrow Wilson High School (Portsmouth, Virginia) alumni
Sportspeople from Portsmouth, Virginia
1914 births
2004 deaths